DD Social League is a social football league held in Cheras, Malaysia. The League is a Malaysian football league at level 4 of the Malaysian football league system.

The season began in September 2018.  The teams were divided into four groups, each containing six teams. The group leaders and runners-up teams in the groups after six matches qualified to the quarterfinals.

History
The league has been established since 2014 albeit undergoes multiple iteration of structures until its current structure took place. Starting from 2018, this league will have promotion to the newly established fourth-tier league called Malaysia M4 League.

2018 teams

Group A
Pranktor
Braboasar
Kickers
Dassad Capitol
Pewaris
DD

Group B
Kara
Bukit Kiara 
Alma
KL Cops
RAJD
Celtico

Group C
KVC
Sungai Sook
Merapok
SS
TMKL
SIP

Group D
Gabungan
Real Melati
Arslan
Senu
Tanjung
SBI

Champions

References

External links
Official Website

4
Malay
Sports leagues established in 2014